Keller may refer to:

People
Keller (surname)
Helen Keller
Keller Williams, jam-band musician
Keller E. Rockey

Places

India
Keller, Shopian

United States
Keller, Georgia
Keller, Indiana
Keller, Texas
Keller, Virginia
Keller, Washington

Other

Keller (automobile)
Keller beer, a style of beer
Keller Graduate School of Management
Keller Group, a British-based ground engineering company

See also
Helen Keller International
Keller Sisters and Lynch
Gottfried-Keller-Preis
Cellarius, a surname
Justice Keller (disambiguation)